Tumse Milke Wrong Number is a 2003 Indian Hindi suspense thriller film of Bollywood, directed by Jignesh M. Vaishnav. This movie was released on 12 December 2003 under the banner of ABC Pictures Private Limited.

Plot
Mahi Mathur is a beautiful college student who likes to enjoy life with her friends. She has a group of jovial students like Karan, Arti and Monti who always make people fools by telephone calls. One day a boy Raj, entrapped by their wrong number call, came to meet with them. But Raj is more intelligent than they thought. Mahi falls in love with Raj. Karan also loves Mahi, but could not express his feelings to Mahi. Mahi's father Dr. Mathur is a professor of psychology in the college who has another stepson Aditya, a police officer. Although Aditya thinks that Dr. Mathur is responsible for his social agony,  Mahi likes him as her elder brother. One day while Mathur was taking an online class with his student Arti, someone killed him. Arti saw the killer's face in the webcam. Before disclosing the name, the killer murdered Arti. Aditya investigates the case and suspects Karan since Dr. Mathur rejected his scholarship in spite of having good results. Arti's gambler uncle recovers the webcam record and finds out the killer. He tries to blackmail him and subsequently gets murdered. At the time of the murder, Monti took an accidental snap of the killer and discovered that Raj is the killer. Now Raj tries to finish Monti also. Aditya saves Monti and sends him to hospital. The killer Raj finally attacks Mahi. He reveals that he was a psychological patient and has a dark past.

Cast
 Richa Pallod as Mahi Mathur
 Parvin Dabas as Karan
 Rakesh Bapat as Raj
 Tinnu Anand as Arti's uncle
 Rinku Ghosh as Arti
 Vrajesh Hirjee as Monti
 Yash Tonk as  Inspector Aditya
 Benjamin Gilani as Dr. Mathur

Music
Tumse Milke. . . . Wrong Number music released on 12 Dec 2003. The songs are written by Praveen Bharadwaj, Daboo Malik, and recorded with the musical genre(s) Hindi, Movie Soundtrack, Bollywood.

Reception
Taran Adarsh of  IndiaFM gave the film 1 out of 5, writing ″Rakesh Bapat hams to the hilt. Also, he looks tired at some places and fresh in some. There's inconsistency in his looks. Parvin Dabas gets no scope. Richa Pallod is quite nice. Rinku Ghosh looks alluring and makes her presence felt. Vrajesh Hirjee plays to the gallery. Yash Tonk is alright. Tinnu Anand and Benjamin Gilani have nothing worthwhile to do. On the whole, WRONG NUMBER just does not connect with the viewer. A dull fare, it faces an uphill task due to weak merits and a poor opening.″  Sukanya Verma of  Rediff.com wrote ″Wrong Number fails to work as a murder mystery for want of thrills and tense moments. It is bland mood right from the beginning to the end. That is by large the only consistent aspect of Wrong Number.″

References

External links
 

2003 films
2000s Hindi-language films
2000s mystery thriller films
2003 crime thriller films
Indian mystery thriller films
Indian crime thriller films